Keith Donegan (born 12 March 1997), is an Irish racing driver and team owner who last drove in the 2022 Formula Regional European Championship for Race Performance Motorsport. He is the owner of the team, having purchased the assets of RP Motorsport in February 2022. Following Round 5 of the championship, Donegan stepped back from driving to continue as just the owner.

Racing career

Karting
Donegan grew up in Navan, Ireland. He started karting at the age of 9, and did two years of karting in his home country of Ireland, and two years in the UK.

Ginetta Junior Championship
Donegan made his car racing debut in the 2012 Ginetta Junior Championship, driving for Beacon Racing in rounds 1-5 and 8-10, and driving for Hillspeed in rounds 6 and 7. With 1 podium, he finished 8th in the standings. 

Donegan joined Douglas Motorsport for the 2013 season. With 4 wins and 12 podiums, he finished as the runner up in the championship.

Formula Ford
After a 3 year sabbatical to focus on his education, Donegan returned to racing in 2017, racing in various Formula Ford events such as the 2017 Formula Ford Festival, where he finished second. He competed again in the Formula Ford Festival in 2018.

U.S. F2000 Championship
In December 2017, Donegan won the Mazda Road to Indy Shootout up against the likes of Liam Lawson, giving him $200,000 to race in the 2018 U.S. F2000 National Championship. Driving with Arms Up Motorsports, he finished 9th in the standings with 1 podium.

Formula Regional European Championship
Prior to Round 1, Donegan joined the grid of the 2022 Formula Regional European Championship, racing alongside Pietro Delli Guanti at his own team, Race Performance Motorsport. He revealed in an interview in mid-2022 that the decision to compete in the championship was "very last minute" and that he "wasn’t prepared and was well over the weight limit".

Following Round 5, he withdrew from a driving role within the team, replacing himself with Owen Tangavelou.

Personal life
After the 2013 Ginetta Junior Championship, Donegan took a 3 year sabbatical from racing to study business at Trinity College Dublin. He had a deal with his mother that if he got certain grades, his parents would buy him a Formula Ford. He achieved the required grades, hence his return to motorsport in Formula Ford in 2017.

Race Performance Motorsport
 

In February 2022, Donegan purchased the assets of RP Motorsport to start his own team, Race Performance Motorsport (RPM). The team is registered in Italy, and based in Piacenza, like its predecessor. With an aim to compete in the Formula Regional European Championship, he took on Enrico Carraro as team manager, and the team made their competition debut in the 2022 Formula Regional European Championship, when they took the place of DR Formula. They competed with Donegan and Pietro Delli Guanti.

In an interview on 16 May 2022, Donegan revealed intentions for the team to field a third car in the Formula Regional European Championship before the end of the 2022 season.

For Round 6 at the Hungaroring, the team fielded Andrea Rosso in the third car to be kept for the remainder of the season, and Owen Tangavelou replaced Donegan as the driver in the second car.

Racing record

Karting career summary

Racing career summary 

† As Donegan was a guest driver, he was ineligible for championship points.
* Season still in progress.

U.S. F2000 Championship

Complete Formula Regional European Championship results 
(key) (Races in bold indicate pole position) (Races in italics indicate fastest lap)

* Season still in progress.

References

External links 
 

1997 births
Living people
Irish racing drivers
Ginetta Junior Championship drivers
Formula Regional European Championship drivers
Formula Ford drivers
U.S. F2000 National Championship drivers
HMD Motorsports drivers
Motorsport team owners